This is a list of all known or suspected Atlantic hurricanes before 1600.  Although most storms likely went unrecorded, and many records have been lost, recollections of hurricane occurrences survive from some sufficiently populated coastal areas, and rarely, ships at sea that survived the tempests.

Observation data for years before 1492 is completely unavailable because most natives of North America lacked written languages to keep records in the pre-Columbian era, and most records in written Mesoamerican languages either do not survive or have not been deciphered and translated. Scientists now regard even data from the early years of the Columbian era as suspicious because Renaissance scientists and sailors made no distinction between tropical cyclones and extratropical systems, and incomplete because European exploration of North America and European colonization of the Americas reached only scattered areas in the 16th century.

However, palaeotempestological research allows reconstruction of pre-historic hurricane activity trends on timescales of centuries to millennia. A theory has been postulated that an anti-phase pattern exists between the Gulf of Mexico coast and the East Coast of the United States. During the quiescent periods, a more northeasterly position of the Azores High would result in more hurricanes being steered towards the Atlantic coast. During the hyperactive period, more hurricanes were steered towards the Gulf coast as the Azores High—controlled by the North Atlantic oscillation—was shifted to a more southwesterly position near the Caribbean. Few major hurricanes struck the Gulf coast during 3000 BC–1400 BC and again during the most recent millennium; these quiescent intervals were separated by a hyperactive period during 1400 BC and AD 1000, when catastrophic hurricanes frequently struck the Gulf coast, and their landfall frequencies increased by a factor of three to five. On the Atlantic coast, probability of landfalling hurricanes has doubled in the recent millennium compared to the one and a half millennia before.

Using sediment samples from Puerto Rico, the Gulf coast and the Atlantic coast from Florida to New England, Michael E. Mann et al. (2009) found consistent evidence of a peak in Atlantic tropical cyclone activity during the Medieval Warm Period followed by a subsequent lull in activity.

Systems
 – only paleotempestological evidence

See also

List of Atlantic hurricanes
Atlantic hurricane season
Paleotempestology

References

Further reading

External links

 
16th century